PRIMUS: Problems, Resources, and Issues in Mathematics Undergraduate Studies is a peer-reviewed academic journal covering the teaching of undergraduate mathematics, established in 1991. The journal has been published by Taylor & Francis since March 2007. It is abstracted and indexed in Cambridge Scientific Abstracts, MathEduc, PsycINFO, and Zentralblatt MATH.

PRIMUS is an affiliated journal of the Mathematical Association of America, so all MAA members have access to PRIMUS.

Editorial Team 
PRIMUS was started by founding editor-in-chief Brian Winkel in 1991 to address the lack of venues for tertiary mathematics educators to share their pedagogical work. In 2011, Jo Ellis-Monaghan became the second editor-in-chief, with Matt Boelkins serving as associate editor. In 2017, Ellis-Monaghan and Boelkins became co-editors-in-chief. 

Currently, Matt Boelkins serves as editor in chief, Kathy Weld as associate editor, Brian P Katz serves as associate and communications editor, and Rachel Schwell as managing editor.

References

External links

Community/editorial website

Publications established in 1991
English-language journals
Mathematics education journals